St. Stephen's Episcopal Church is an historic Episcopal church building located northeast of Ridgeway, South Carolina, on County Road 106. Built of wood in 1854 in the Carpenter Gothic style, it was designed by the Rev. John Dewitt McCollough, who later became its rector. The exterior was painted a maroon color. In 1920, its exterior wood was covered by brick veneer, so that it appears today as a brick Gothic Revival style building on the outside while the interior retains its Carpenter Gothic features. A wing was added in the 1940s to create space for a parish hall and Sunday school.

On May 6, 1971, it was added to the National Register of Historic Places.

History of parish
St. Stephen's was founded in 1839 as a chapel of ease for St. John's Parish, Fairfield, and remained such until 1889 when it became a separate parish. Among its early rectors was the Rev. William Porcher DuBose, who served from 1865 to 1868.

References

External links
 South Carolina Department of Archives and History listing for St. Stephen's Episcopal Church

Churches on the National Register of Historic Places in South Carolina
Carpenter Gothic church buildings in South Carolina
Episcopal churches in South Carolina
Churches completed in 1854
19th-century Episcopal church buildings
Churches in Fairfield County, South Carolina
National Register of Historic Places in Fairfield County, South Carolina